Holly Hill is a town in Orangeburg County, South Carolina, United States. The population was 1,277 at the 2010 census.  Prior to 1910 it was located in the northwest portion of Saint James Goose Creek Township, Berkeley County.

History
Dantzler Plantation and Providence Methodist Church are listed on the National Register of Historic Places.

Geography
Holly Hill is located at  (33.3243, -80.4112).

Demographics

2020 census

As of the 2020 United States census, there were 1,298 people, 507 households, and 321 families residing in the town.

2000 census
As of the census of 2000, there were 1,281 people, 502 households, and 359 families residing in the town. The population density was 950.7 people per square mile (366.4/km2). There were 575 housing units at an average density of 426.7 per square mile (164.5/km2). The racial makeup of the town was 48.95% White, 50.04% African American, 0.39% Native American, 0.08% Asian, and 0.55% from two or more races. Hispanic or Latino of any race were 0.47% of the population.

There were 502 households, out of which 27.9% had children under the age of 18 living with them, 50.6% were married couples living together, 18.9% had a female householder with no husband present, and 28.3% were non-families. 26.5% of all households were made up of individuals, and 13.9% had someone living alone who was 65 years of age or older. The average household size was 2.53 and the average family size was 3.05.

In the town, the age distribution of the population shows 24.4% under the age of 18, 8.2% from 18 to 24, 23.8% from 25 to 44, 26.0% from 45 to 64, and 17.6% who were 65 years of age or older. The median age was 40 years. For every 100 females, there were 79.9 males. For every 100 females age 18 and over, there were 76.5 males.

The median income for a household in the town was $33,036, and the median income for a family was $43,611. Males had a median income of $36,944 versus $21,346 for females. The per capita income for the town was $16,437. About 10.7% of families and 15.7% of the population were below the poverty line, including 20.2% of those under age 18 and 14.3% of those age 65 or over.

Education
Holly Hill has a public library, a branch of the Orangeburg County Library.

Notable people
 Jimmie Coker (1936-1991)– former Major League Baseball player
 Adrian Dingle - football player
 Mike Williams- NFL football player 
 Frank Culbertson, Jr. – former NASA Space Shuttle astronaut
 Brett Gardner – Major League Baseball player
 Willie Randolph – former Major League Baseball player and manager
 Eddie Sweat (1939-1998)– groom to U. S. Triple Crown winner Secretariat

References

External links

Information about Holly Hill from Orangeburg County
 Town of Holly Hill, South Carolina Website

Towns in Orangeburg County, South Carolina
Towns in South Carolina